The fourth series of the Ojarumaru anime series aired from April 2 to November 30, 2001 on NHK for a total of 90 episodes.

The series' opening theme is "Utahito" (詠人) by Saburō Kitajima. The ending theme is "Koi o Itashi Mashou♪" (恋をいたしましょう♪ Let us Love♪) by Rie Iwatsubo.

The series was released on VHS by Nippon Crown across fifteen volumes, each containing 6 episodes, from August 3 to April 5, 2001. Nippon Crown later released the series on DVD across two compilation volumes, each containing 10 selected episodes, simultaneously on April 2, 2003. The first volume contains episodes 273 through 276, 290, 296, 303, 305, and 319. The second volume contains episodes 322, 326, 328, 329, 337, 339, 347, 351, 354, and 357.

Episodes

References

External links
 Series 4 episode list

Ojarumaru episode lists